Beau Grayson Sulser (born May 5, 1994) is an American professional baseball pitcher for the KT Wiz of the KBO League. He played in Major League Baseball for the Pittsburgh Pirates and the Baltimore Orioles in 2022.

Career

Amateur career
Sulser attended Ramona High School in Ramona, California. He enrolled at Dartmouth College, where he played college baseball for the Dartmouth Big Green from 2013 to 2017. In 2017, he was named the Ivy League's pitcher of the year.

Pittsburgh Pirates
The Pittsburgh Pirates selected Sulser in the tenth round of the 2017 Major League Baseball draft. On April 24, 2022, the Pirates promoted Sulser to the major leagues. He made his major league debut on April 26. Sulser appeared in four games for Pittsburgh, allowing four runs. He was designated for assignment on May 12.

Baltimore Orioles
Sulser was claimed off waivers by the Baltimore Orioles two days later on May 14. He allowed five runs and 16 hits in  innings over six relief appearances before being designated for assignment on October 14, 2022. On October 18, 2022, the Pirates claimed Sulser off of waivers; they outrighted him to the minor leagues on November 10.

KT Wiz 
On November 23, 2022, Sulser signed a one-year, $740,000 contract with the KT Wiz of the KBO League.

Personal life
His brother, Cole, is also a professional baseball player.

References

External links

Living people
1994 births
People from Escondido, California
Baseball players from California
Major League Baseball pitchers
Pittsburgh Pirates players
Baltimore Orioles players
Dartmouth Big Green baseball players
West Virginia Black Bears players
West Virginia Power players
Altoona Curve players
Peoria Javelinas players
Perth Heat players
Indianapolis Indians players
Norfolk Tides players